20th Anniversary is The Rippingtons' fourteenth album, which was released in 2006. As the title states, this album commemorates the band's 20 years performing together.

Track listing

Packaged with the album is a DVD which contains a 25-minute retrospective, as well as four music videos:
"Tourist in Paradise" (from Tourist in Paradise)
"Curves Ahead" (from Curves Ahead)
"High Roller" (from Live in L.A.)
"I'll Be Around" (from Sahara)

References

The Rippingtons albums
2006 albums